Life Bites is a British adaptation of the Italian series Life Bites – Pillole di vita by Disney Channel Italy. It premiered on 6 September 2008. The show series looks at the everyday adventures of Chloe and Harvey, who are brother and sister and their relationships with family and friends. Each episode looks at variety of themes including school, dating, sport and music. The school which they attend is filmed at Brentside High School in Hanwell, West London.

The first season premiered on 6 September 2008 and has 16 episodes; the second season started in July 2009 and has 12 episodes, including a Halloween special and a Christmas special.

Cast

Main 
 Amy Wren as Chloe
 Benedict Smith as Harvey, brother of Chloe
 Tianna Webster as Molly, younger sister of Chloe and Harvey
 Nicola Posener as Pyper, Chloe's best friend
 Naomi Scott as Megan, Pyper's and Chloe's best friend
 Rupert Simonian as Frank, classmate
 Lucien Laviscount as Jake, Harvey's best friend
 Dominique Moore as Esther, Chloe's and Pyper's best friend
 Jeremy Irvine as Luke, Harvey and Frank's best friend

Recurring 
 Neil Roberts as Richard
 Andrea Spisto as Jenni
 Claire Cage as Mum 
 Brad Kavanagh as band member in Harvey's, Frank's and Luke's band

References

External links 
 

Disney Channel (British and Irish TV channel) original programming
2000s British children's television series
2008 British television series debuts
2009 British television series endings